Carex capillaris, the hair-like sedge, is a species of sedge found in North America and northern Eurasia including Greenland.

Carex tiogana, from northern California, is sometimes included in Carex capillaris. Two subspecies are accepted:

 Carex capillaris subsp. capillaris
 Carex capillaris subsp. fuscidula (V.I.Krecz. ex T.V.Egorova) Á.Löve & D.Löve

Ecology
Carex capillaris is a known host to species of fungi, including Anthracoidea capillaris, Didymella proximella, Lophodermium caricinum and
Puccinia dioicae.

References

External links
 

capillaris
Flora of North America
Plants described in 1753
Taxa named by Carl Linnaeus

Flora of Greenland